RMS Andania  was a British ocean liner launched in 1921. She was the first of six 14,000-ton "A"-class liners built for the Cunard Line in the early 1920s.

Construction
The ship was constructed in Hebburn, England by the shipbuilders Hawthorn Leslie and Company, was 538 feet long, and measured just under 14,000 tons.  She could carry more than 1,700 passengers and required 270 crew.  She firstly worked on the Hamburg to New York City route, and later between Liverpool and Montreal.

Use during WW II
At the start of World War II, Andania was requisitioned for use as an armed merchant cruiser (as was her sister ship Aurania) and armed with six old 6-inch (152 mm) guns, two 3-inch (76 mm) anti-aircraft guns and several machine guns. On 25 November 1939 she took up her naval duties as HMS Andania with the Northern Patrol.

Fate
Three more torpedoes fired by UA missed. Andania stayed afloat for several hours but was too damaged to be saved. She sank early on 16 June. While other ships of the Northern Patrol were in the vicinity – HMS Derbyshire was actually within visual range – they had strict orders not to risk rescue when a submarine was suspected nearby. However, the entire crew on the Andania was rescued by the Icelandic fishing vessel Skallagrimur.

References

Bibliography

External links
 Cabin Liners: Cunard's "A"-Class Liners 1922

1921 ships
Ships built on the River Tyne
Ships of the Cunard Line
World War II merchant ships of the United Kingdom
Ships sunk by German submarines in World War II
World War II shipwrecks in the Atlantic Ocean
Maritime incidents in June 1940
World War II Auxiliary cruisers of the Royal Navy
Ships sunk with no fatalities